Carpodiptera ophiticola is a species of flowering plant in the family Malvaceae. It is found only in Cuba. It is threatened by habitat loss.

References

ophiticola
Endemic flora of Cuba
Endangered plants
Taxonomy articles created by Polbot